Euplassa occidentalis is a species of plant in the family Proteaceae. It is endemic to Ecuador.

References

occidentalis
Endemic flora of Ecuador
Vulnerable flora of South America
Taxonomy articles created by Polbot